André Quilis (28 October 1941 – 19 November 2020) was a French rugby union player. He played at the flanker position.

Biography
Quilis played for RC Narbonne from 1962 to 1971. With the club, he won the Challenge Yves du Manoir in 1968 and the Trophée rugby Panache Pernod in 1969. He played in five games for the National Team from 1967 to 1971, including the 1971 Six Nations Championship. He was a player-coach for Cuxac d'Aude from 1971 to 1972 and then coached until his retirement in 2001.

References

1941 births
2020 deaths
French rugby union players
French rugby union coaches
USA Perpignan coaches